Centennial Lake may refer to one of two lakes in Ontario, Canada:
Centennial Lake (Algoma District)
Centennial Lake (Renfrew County)
Centennial Lake Provincial Nature Reserve

See also
Lake Centennial (Maryland)
Centennial Lakes Park (Minnesota)
Centennial (disambiguation)